Darabdin-e Rowshan (also Romanized as Dārābdīn-e Rowshan) is a village in Bahnemir Rural District, Bahnemir District, Babolsar County, Mazandaran Province, Iran. At the 2006 census, its population was 659, in 164 families.

References 

Populated places in Babolsar County